Mountain View is an unincorporated community in Whatcom County, in the U.S. state of Washington.

History
A post office called Mountain View was established in 1891, and remained in operation until 1908. The community was named for mountain views afforded from the elevated town site.

References

Unincorporated communities in Whatcom County, Washington
Unincorporated communities in Washington (state)